Fire Hawk: Thexder - The Second Contact (テグザー2 ファイアーホーク), also known as Firehawk: Thexder 2, Firehawk or Thexder II, is a video game developed and published by Game Arts for the MSX2, MS-DOS and PC-8801 in 1989 as a sequel to Thexder only in Japan. The MS-DOS version was later released by Sierra On-Line.

Gameplay

Plot

Reception
The One predicted that "with furious arcade action, high-resolution graphics and 11 complete songs (...) Thexder II looks set to surpass the success of the original." The game was indeed well-received upon release and sold well both in Japan and in the USA.

References

External links
  

1989 video games
DOS games
MSX2 games
NEC PC-8801 games
Run and gun games
Science fiction video games
Single-player video games
Video games about robots
Video game sequels
Video games developed in Japan
Video games featuring female protagonists
Game Arts games